Harvey George "Harvie" Teno (February 15, 1915 – September 9, 1990) was a Canadian ice hockey player who played five games in the National Hockey League with the Detroit Red Wings during the 1938–39 season. The rest of his career, which lasted from 1934 to 1948, was spent in various minor leagues.

Career statistics

Regular season and playoffs

External links
 

1915 births
1990 deaths
Atlantic City Sea Gulls (EHL) players
Buffalo Bisons (AHL) players
Canadian expatriates in the United States
Canadian ice hockey goaltenders
Cleveland Barons (1937–1973) players
Detroit Red Wings players
Hershey Bears players
Ice hockey people from Ontario
Minneapolis Millers (AHA) players
Ontario Hockey Association Senior A League (1890–1979) players
Philadelphia Ramblers players
Pittsburgh Hornets players
Sportspeople from Windsor, Ontario
Toronto St. Michael's Majors players